Catherine Gfeller (born 5 March 1966) is a Swiss artist. She currently lives and works in Paris and Southern France after having lived in New York from 1995 to 1999.

Career 
After a Master in Fine Arts in 1991 at the Universities of Neuchâtel and Lausanne, she devoted herself to photography. Gfeller traveled to many different continents (Europe, South Africa, Asia, South America, North America) to create large landscape triptychs (“A Matter of Landscape”). In 1995, she received a grant for a one-year residency in New York. There, she developed a printing technique which combines paper, monoprint and photography on the theme of urban landscape ("Urban Friezes").

In 1999 she was invited for a residency at the Cité Internationale des Arts in Paris where she received the Photography Award from the HSBC Foundation.  Paris inspires a new work (“Multi-Compositions”), focused on metaphorical urban subjects using various media: video, sound and the written word. Intimate spaces and daily gestures create new multi-layered compositions where urban rhythms still resonate as an acting presence (“The Insiders”, “Chimeras”, “Domestic Pieces”, “Waders”).

In 2010-2012 her monographic exhibition "Pulsations" was hosted by Museum of Fine Arts La Chaux-de-Fonds, Museum of Fine Arts KKL Luzern and Center of contemporary Arts Sète (South of France) .

Recent Projects:

2013: Film "Words of Artists/Portraits of Artists" (87 Min.), Swiss contemporary art, produced by Richard Dindo and Swiss Television RTS Zürich.

2014: Residency and exhibition at WAM Museum in Johannesburg.

2015: Dozen of artistic projects combining installation, performance, photography, video, radio and soundwalk, the Zentrum Paul Klee in Bern (architect: Renzo Piano).

2017: "Voices in Kyiv" multi-media exhibition, Shevchenko National Museum, Kyiv, Ukraine.

2018: "Guangzhou Driftings" multi-media exhibition, Guangdong Museum of Art, Guangzhou, China. This project will continue with new themes in Hong Kong and Beijing in 2020.

Catherine Gfeller has exhibited extensively in Switzerland, France, Italy, England, Holland, Germany, Belgium, South America, the United States, Canada, South Africa, Ukraine and China. Her work belongs to private and public collections in Switzerland, France, England, Italy, Germany, Japan, Belgium and the United States. She regularly takes part in Art Fairs, such as ArtBasel, Kunst Zurich, Armory Show, la Fiac, Ljubjana Biennale and Art Bruxelles. Parallel to her exhibitions, Catherine Gfeller is invited to give lectures and workshops in universities.

She also produces large-scale commissions for public spaces.

Solo exhibitions

Information is from her own web site at catherinegfeller.com

1994
 Galerie Fotoart Neugebauer, Basel, Switzerland

1995
 The Matter of Landscape, Royal Pavilion and Art Museum, Brighton, England

1996
 Landscapes, Center for Photography, Geneva, Switzerland
 New York Façades, Villa du Jardin alpin, Meyrin, Genève
 Six Chapel Row  Gallery, Bath, England

1997
 Frises Urbaines, Villa Le Corbusier (Centre Ebel), La Chaux-de-Fonds, Switzerland
 Urban Friezes, Landon Gallery, New York
 The Matter of Landscape, Pennings Gallery, Eindhoven, Netherlands

1998
 Landscapes, Centro cultural Recoleta, Buenos Aires, Argentina
 Blancpain Stepczynski Gallery, Geneva, Switzerland
 Urban Friezes, Pentimenti Gallery, Philadelphia
 Natural and Urban Landscapes, La Maison française, New-York University, New York
 Urban Friezes, The Landon Gallery, New York

1999
 Urban Rituals, Pentimenti Gallery, Philadelphia
 Frises urbaines, Baudoin Lebon Gallery, Paris
 Urban Rituals, Southeast Museum of Photography, Daytona Beach, Florida
 Urban Friezes, Ruth Bachofner Gallery, Bergamot Art Center, Los Angeles
 Catherine Gfeller photography, Swiss Embassy, Paris

2000
 FIAC, One-man-show C. Gfeller Carzaniga Gallery, Paris
 Urban images Southeast Museum of Photography, Daytona Beach, Florida
 School of Fine Arts, CCF Foundation for Photography, Dijon, France
 Le Carré Gallery, CCF Foundation for Photography, Lille, France
 La Filature Gallery, CCF Foundation for Photography, Mulhouse, France
 Sur l’écran de la ville, Windows in Champs Elysées, Foundation HSBC Foundation for Photography, Paris

2001
 Serial Visitors, Keitelman Gallery, Bruxelles

2002
 Versions d’elle, Centre Culturel Switzerland, Mois de la Photo, Paris
 Parcours Face à Face, ArtMateur, Museum of Fine Arts, Lille, France
 New York : Frises urbaines, Ileana Bouboulis Gallery, Paris   
 Urban Friezes, Galerie Carzaniga & Uecker, Basel

2003
 Ruth Bachofner Gallery, Bergamot Art Center, Los Angeles
 Fictions Urbaines, Rez d’art contemporain Meyzieu/Lyon, France

2004
 She wanders through B., Galerie Carzaniga, Basel

2005
 Jubilee : 250 years, Bank Leu Zurich, Switzerland

2006
 Many Times, Stephen Haller Gallery, New York
 D'une Ville l'autre, Carzaniga Gallery, Basel, Switzerland

2008
 Ruth Bachofner Gallery, Bergamot Art Center, Los Angeles

2009
 Elles et Villes, Une Gallery, Neuchâtel, Switzerland
 Villes et Elles, Carzaniga Gallery, Basel, Switzerland

2010
 Pulsations, Museum of Fine Arts, La Chaux-de-Fonds, Switzerland
 Processions Croisées, Abbatiale de Bellelay, Switzerland 
 Les Frayeuses, Rosa Turetsky Gallery, Geneva

2011
 Pulsations, Kunstmuseum Luzern, Switzerland
 Pulsations, CRAC, Contemporary Art Center, LR, Sète, France

2013
 Pulsations, Galerie Springer, Berlin
 Belles de Nuit, Turetsky Gallery, Geneva

2014
 Identity, C Gallery, Neuchâtel
 The City is Passing Through You, Wits Art Museum, Johannesburg, South Africa
 Au plus noir du Jour, Carzaniga Gallery, Basel, Switzerland
 Processions, AL/MA Gallery, Montpellier, France

2015
 ZigZag ZPK (photo, video, installation, performance, sound walk) Zentrum Paul Klee, Bern
 Urban Friezes, Batut Gallery Space, F- Labruguière, Midi-Pyrénées

2016
 Ville de rêves, Neuchâtel University
A la croisée des mondes avec M. de Meuron, Rondes romaines, MAHN, Neuchâtel, Switzerland

2017
 End of the games, HtH, National Theater 13 Vents, Montpellier

2018
 China Driftings, Galerie RX, Paris
 Guangzhou Driftings, Guangdong Museum of Art, Guangzhou, China 
 Voices in Kyiv, Tars Shevchenko National Museum, Kyiv, Ukraine
 Cinema and Photography, Festival 7e Art, Marie du VII, Paris

Collective exhibitions

1993
 Digital Landscapes, International  Festival of Photography, Isle of Skye, Scotland
 Digital Landscapes, International Festival of Photography, The Works, Edmonton, Canada
 Digital Landscapes, Maryland Institute of Art, Baltimore 
 Sequenze, Museo di Fotografia Contemporanea, Brescia, Italy

1994
 Viaggio intorno alla mia camera, Fondazione G.Costa, Genova, Italy

1996
 Soho Annual, Soho Arts Festival, New York
 Belluard Bollwerk International Festival, Fribourg, Switzerland

1997
 Biennal, Museum of Fine Arts La Chaux-de-Fonds, Switzerland
 Aerial Perspectives, DC Moore Gallery, New York
 Aerial Perspectives Kendall Gallery, Miami
 Swiss Art: Old World, New World, Pentimenti Gallery, Philadelphia
 Group Show, Tibor de Nagy/First Street Gallery, New York 
 Selections, Visual Arts Gallery, Soho, New York

1998
 Triennal, Museum of Fine Arts, Le Locle, Switzerland
 Boston International Fine Art Show, Pentimenti Gallery, Boston
 Kunst Zurich Art Fair, Carzaniga and Uecker Gallery, Zurich, Switzerland
 Ritratti, Museo di Fotografia Contemporanea, Brescia, Italy
 New York Visions, Michael Ingbar Gallery, New York 
 Auction, Fotomuseum, Winterthur, Switzerland
 Young Artists, Sotheby's, Tel-Aviv, Israël2

1999
 Beyond Landscapes, Schneider Gallery, Chicago
 Art Basel 30, Carzaniga Gallery, Basel, Switzerland
 Swiss Art, Auction, Swiss Institute of New York, New York 
 Summer Show, Fotografie Forum, Frankfurt
 Soho Annual, Soho Arts Festival, New York 
 Belluard Bollwerk International Festival, Fribourg, Switzerland
 Cultura ArtFair, Alexia Goethe Fine Art Gallery, Basel, Switzerland
 Six Young Artists, Carzaniga and Uecker Gallery, Basel, Switzerland

2000
 Paris Photo, Corporate Collections CCF, Paris
 Mois de la Photo, Baudoin Lebon Gallery, Paris
 Friends of Photography, Ansel Adams Center, San Francisco
 Art Basel 31, Carzaniga Gallery, Basel, Switzerland
 Urban images, Southeast Museum of Photography, Daytona Beach
 KunstZurich, Carzaniga and Uecker Gallery, Zürich, Switzerland

2001
 Not Landscape, Camera Works, San Francisco, California
 FIAC, Keitelmann Gallery, Paris 
 Francophonies, Museum of Fine Arts, Ottawa
 De natura rerum, Paysage - cosa mentale, Baudoin Lebon Gallery, Paris
 Lubljana  24th Biennal, Ljubljana, Slovenia
 Art Basel 32, Carzaniga Gallery, Basel, Switzerland
 Art Unlimited, Art Basel, Basel
 Art Brussels, Keitelmann Gallery, Bruxelles
 Art Miami, Haim Chanin Gallery, NY, Miami
 International Triennal of Prints, Le Locle, Switzerland  

2002
 Photographie Romande, Musée de l’Elysée, Lausanne, Switzerland
 Art Basel 33, Carzaniga Gallery, Basel, Switzerland
 Expo 02, Diaporama, Museum of Fine Arts Square, Neuchâtel, Switzerland
 Art Brussels, Keitelmann Gallery, Bruxelles
 Armory Show, Eyestorm, New York
 The colour of white, Gallery at Pentagram Design, London  

2003
 Art Basel, Carzaniga Gallery, Basel, Switzerland
 Interdit aux moins de 18 ans, Une Gallery, Neuchâtel, Switzerland
 Intimités, Hôtel de ville, Paris
 VideoKiosk  Fotomuseum Winterthur, Switzerland
 States, Filmprogramm, Movie Theater of contemporary arts center of Meyzieu/Lyon
 Nuit Blanche  Videoprogramm, Movie Theater l’Entrepôt, Paris

2004
 Paris Photo, Carrousel du Louvre, Baudoin Lebon Gallery, Paris
 Narratives, Stephen Haller Gallery, New York
 20 Years, Ruth Bachofner Gallery, Los Angeles
 Notte, Fondazione Olivetti, Rome
 D’un espace à l’autre, 2nd Biennal Contemporary Arts, Saint-Cloud, Paris

2005
 La Nuit de la Photo, 50 Swiss Photographers, Musée de l’Elysée, Lausanne, Switzerland
 Villes imprévisibles, Architecture Forum, Design Museum, Lausanne, Switzerland

2006
 Paris Photo Studio Franck Bordas, Paris  

2007
 Biennal, Museum of Fine Arts, La Chaux-de-Fonds (Award), Switzerland
 Migrations, Biennal Contemporary Arts, Dieppe, France
 Off Time, SaarlandMuseum Saarbrücken, Germany
 Contemporary Photography, Laureats Award Foundation HSBC for Photography, Les Rencontres de la Photographie, Arles, France
 FIAF, Festival Video, Espace Neruda, Nîmes
 Shift Video Festival, Basel

2008
 Festival Video du Centre Pompidou et Musée Fabre, AL/MA Gallery, Montpellier, France
 Still Cinema 6, OpenEyeGallery, Contemporary Arts Biennal, Liverpool
 Make Believe, Photographic Days, ArtCenter Pasquart, Bienne
 Jeanne Lombard et les Artistes contemporaines, Museum of Fine Arts, Neuchâtel, Switzerland

2009
 Cheminements, Center of Photography, Lectoure, Toulouse, France
 Video Installation on 6 screens, Eglise Saint-Clar and Chapelle Saint-Blaise, France
 Ex Nugis Seria, Fondation nationale des arts plastiques, Maison des Arts, Nogent-sur-Marne, Paris
 ArteVideoNight, Preview, Centre Pompidou, Paris and FIAC, Paris
 KunstZurich, Carzaniga Gallery, Zurich, Switzerland

2010
 La revanche de l’Archive, Festival 50 JPG, Center of Photography, Geneva, Switzerland
 Tribute to Nadar, French Embassy, Trinité des Monts, Rome and Museum Marino Marini, Florence
 Complicity, 60 years of Picto, Les Rencontres Internationales de la Photographie, Arles, France
 Séries, Suites, Variations, Museum of Fine Arts, Neuchâtel, Switzerland
 Kunst Zurich, Galerie Carzaniga, Zürich, Switzerland
 Projection, 15 years Foundation for Photography, RIP, Arles

2011
 L’Oeil sur les rues, La Villette, Paris
 Images-Mouvement, Center of Contemporary Art, Geneva, Switzerland
 Art Basel, Carzaniga Gallery, Basel, Switzerland
 Territories of Light, Ecole française de Rome, Piazza Navone, Rome 
 VideoParcours « Finis», Transhitorisches Museum, Pfyn, Switzerland
 Millenium, Museum of Fine Arts, Neuchâtel, Switzerland

2012
 Snow, Ilan Engel Gallery, Paris
 'Undercurrents', Stephen Haller Gallery, New York 
 Belles de Jour, Galerie Une, Neuchâtel, Switzerland
 Objectifs, Objectivités, Officine Fotografiche, Rome
 Saison Vidéo,, Espaces Croisés, Lille, France
 30 Anniversary, Rosa Turetsky Gallery, Geneva, Switzerland
 Ex Nugis Seria, Collection of F. Denaës, Le Château d’eau, Toulouse, France
 10 Years, Galerie AL/MA, Montpellier

2013
 Art Paris, Grand Palais, Galerie Ilan Engel
 SynchroniCity, Ilan Engel Gallery, Paris
 Feminine Spirituality, Hiéron Museum, Paray-le-Monial, France 
 Urbi et Orbi: Biennal of Video and Photography, Sedan, France 
 Collection Julius Baer, Museo cantonale d'arte, Lugano, Switzerland
 Contemporary Artists France-Italy, Palazzo delle Belle Arti, Torino, Italy
 Kunst Zürich, Carzaniga Gallery, Zürich

2014
 First Choice, Galerie Springer, Berlin
 Kunst Zürich, Galerie Carzaniga, Zürich
 Video-Time, Ilan Engel Gallery, Paris

2015
 Art en plein air Môtiers, Môtiers, Switzerland
 Imago Mundi Helvetia, Luciano Benetton Collection, Fondazione Cini, Venice Biennal, Venice
 Alt+1000 Contemporary Photography Festival,  Rossinière (Gstaad Region)
 A.I.R. Arlberg Hospiz, St.Christoph und Bregenz, Tirol, Austria 
 Meta Project, Galerie Laurent Müller, Paris
 Kunst Zürich Art Fair, Carzaniga Gallery, Zürich 
 Le Nonante-Neuf, Les Rencontres de la Photographie, Arles

2016
 Cityscapes, Carzaniga Gallery, Basel
 Arts speaks out, Ikono TV, Museum Istanbul Modern
 Dream to Utopia (MdM), Gallery C, Neuchâtel

2018
 Carnets, Halle Nord, Centre d'art en l'Ile, Genève
 Dialogues Art sacré/art contemporain,  Churches in Ariège

2019
Fotografica, FotoMuseo, Bogotà
Art Genève, Rosa Turetsky Gallery, Geneva, Switzerland

2020
 (cooming soon) Bxl Universel, L’Usine électrique, Bruxelles

Bibliography

Monographs 
 "Catherine Gfeller : Processions croisées", textes : Bernard Comment et Caroline Nicod, Edition Clandestin et Fondation de l’Abbatiale de Bellelay, Bienne, Switzerland, 2010
 "Pulsations", exhibition Musée des Beaux-Arts de la Chaux-de-Fonds et Kunstmusem Luzern, textes : Paul Ardenne, Elisabeth Lebovici, Françoise Ninghetto, Urs Sahel, Edizioni Perfiferia, Lucerne, 2010
 "Vidéo-Divagations", text : Frédérique Villemur Editions de l’Espérou, Montpellier, France, 2011
 "Sévilles en vierges", text Jean-Pierre Brice Olivier, Bernard Salignon, Editions du Cerf, Paris, 2012
 "Au plus noir du jour", text Jérôme Neutres, Carzaniga Gallery, Basel, 2014

Collective Books 
 "A Matter of Landscape," text : Julia Ballerini, exhibition New York, New York, 1997
 "Urban Rituals", text : A. Mingam, Collection Fondation HSBC pour la Photographie, Editions Actes Sud, Arles, France,1999
 "Regard sur la Villa turque de Le Corbusier", textes: Daniel Schwarz et C.Gfeller, Editions Montres Ebel, La Chaux-de-Fonds, Switzerland, 1999
 "Urban Scenes", A. Carzaniga, text : A. Carzaniga et C.Gfeller, Basel, Switzerland, 1999
 "La ville, un corps sensible", texte:Urs Stahel, Galerie Carzaniga +Uecker, Basel, Switzerland, 2000
 "Serial Visitors", text : Bernard Comment, Editions Galerie Carzaniga & Uecker, Basel, Switzerland, 2002
 "Dérobades", Carnets de la création contemporaine, texte : Bernard Salignon, Editions de l’œil et Centre Culturel Suisse, Paris, 2002
 "Fictions urbaines", texts :Bernard Salignon, Rez d'art contemporain, Meyzieu-Lyon, France, 2003
 "250 Jahre Bank Leu : Im Wechsel der Perspektiven", texte : Andreas Honegger, Editions Orell Füssli, Zürich, 2005
 "Villes et Elles", text : Guido Magnaguagno, Galerie Carzaniga, Basel, 2009

References

External links
Catherine Gfeller - website
Prix HSBC pour la photographie

1966 births
Living people
Swiss photographers
People from Neuchâtel
Swiss expatriates in France
University of Neuchâtel alumni
Academic staff of the University of Lausanne